Land of the Six Guns is a 1940 American Western film directed by Raymond K. Johnson and written by Carl Krusada. The film stars Jack Randall, Louise Stanley, Frank LaRue, Glenn Strange, Bud Osborne and George Chesebro. The film was released on May 9, 1940, by Monogram Pictures.

Plot

Cast           
Jack Randall as Jack Rowan
Louise Stanley as Carol Howard
Frank LaRue as John Howard
Glenn Strange as Manny
Bud Osborne as Sheriff
George Chesebro as Taylor
Steve Clark as Frank Stone
Kenne Duncan as Max 
Richard Cramer as Mexican Joe
Jack Perrin as Davis 
Carl Mathews as Drake

References

External links
 

1940 films
American Western (genre) films
1940 Western (genre) films
Monogram Pictures films
Films directed by Raymond K. Johnson
American black-and-white films
1940s English-language films
1940s American films